Queen Charlotte was built on the Thames in 1790. She made eight voyages for the Hudson's Bay Company (HBC) before it sold her in 1800. She then traded to South America and the Mediterranean. In 1803 her crew mutinied and turned her over to the French, who promptly handed her and them back to the British authorities, despite the two countries being at war. She then spent much of her career sailing between London and the Cape of Good Hope (CGH; the Cape). She was sailing for the Cape in October 1813 when a collision with another vessel resulted in Queen Charlotte being wrecked shortly thereafter.

Career
Queen Charlotte spent the first decade of her career sailing for the HBC. during this time she made eight voyages between London and Hudson Bay, primarily to York Factory.

In early 1804 Queen Charlotte, Andrews, master, was returning from Smyrna on her way to London when she put in at Gibraltar. There her crew took control of her and sailed to Cadiz where they turned themselves over to the French Navy. However, at Cadiz the captain of a French 74-gun, took vessel and crew into custody, turning them over to the British consul. The French also returned Queen Charlotte to Andrew's control.

Lloyd's List reported on 15 November 1811 that Queen Charlotte, Andrews, master, had lost an anchor and cable in Margate Roads.

On 27 December 1812 Queen Charlotte sailed from Rio de Janeiro together with four three other British merchant vessels bound for Great Britain and under convoy by the schooner . At  one left the group, all of which, including Queen Charlotte,  Jackson, master, were short of provisions. Queen Charlotte was bound for Greenock.

Fate
Queen Charlotte collided on 20 October 1813 with the transport Phœbe and sank off Spithead. Queen Charlottes mate drowned. She was on a voyage from London to the Cape of Good Hope. Queen Charlotte was raised from six fathoms of water to  feet in early December but a gale on 10 December broke up her decks and scattered her cargo. LR for 1814 carried the annotation "sunk" by her name.

Post script
She may have been salvaged and become .

Notes

Citations

References
 

1790 ships
Ships built in England
Hudson's Bay Company ships
Age of Sail merchant ships of England
Maritime incidents in 1813